Klaus Ohlmann (born 1952 in Neustadt, Germany) is a German glider pilot who has established 36 world records approved by FAI. Among these is the record for a free distance flight with up to 3 turn-points by flying 3,009 km from Chapelco Airport at San Martín de los Andes (Argentina) in a Schempp-Hirth Nimbus 4 DM on 21 January 2003 with his co-pilot Karl Rabeder.
On 9 January 2003 at El Calafate in Argentina he made a flight of 2,247.6 km in a Schempp-Hirth Nimbus 4 DM. This set a new world free distance record, breaking the record set over 30 years earlier by Hans-Werner Grosse.

On 1 February 2014, he became the first–ever pilot to fly over Mount Everest in a glider.

He is a member of the Mountain Wave Project of the meteorological section of OSTIV. 
Flying in wave conditions are his forte. Klaus lives in southern France, near Serres, where he has a glider center called Quo Vadis, renowned for his guided flights in the area.

Solar-powered pending claim at FAI 
Claim number : 16110
Sub-class :CS (Solar-Powered Aeroplane)
Type of record : Free out-and-return distance
Course/location : _to be advised
Performance : 155.8 km
Pilot : Klaus OHLMANN (Germany)
Aircraft : ICARE 2
Date :22.09.2010
Current record :  no record set yet

References

Glider pilots
German aviators
Flight distance record holders
1952 births
Living people
Lilienthal Gliding Medal recipients
Glider flight record holders
German aviation record holders